Fit 2 Stitch is an American television show hosted by Peggy Sagers airing on Create TV, part of the Public Broadcasting Service, and distributed by American Public Television. The series also airs reruns on World Harvest Television.

PBS original programming
2014 American television series debuts